Moulvibazar District Stadium, also known as Saifur Rahman Stadium, is a multi-use stadium in Moulvibazar, Bangladesh.  It is currently used mostly for cricket and association football matches and is named after former Finance Minister  Saifur Rahman. Horse racing is also a common sport held in the stadium as well. The stadium has a capacity of 20,000 people. It was built in 2001 and it opened in 2005. The complex also contains an indoor stadium, gallery, VIP gallery, dressing room, bathroom and a collapsible gate. The indoor stadium, known as Sheikh Russel Indoor Stadium was funded by Olila Group, opened on 21 September 2018 and is predominantly used for kabaddi and badminton.

See also
List of football stadiums in Bangladesh
Stadiums in Bangladesh
Tangail Stadium

References

Football venues in Bangladesh
Moulvibazar
Buildings and structures in Sylhet Division
Multi-purpose stadiums
Cricket grounds in Bangladesh